Euseius ricinus is a species of mite in the family Phytoseiidae.

References

ricinus
Articles created by Qbugbot
Animals described in 1982